Granville Bates (January 7, 1882 – July 8, 1940) was an American character actor and bit player, appearing in over ninety films.

Biography
Bates was born in Chicago in 1882 to Granville Bates, Sr., a developer and builder, and Adaline Bates (née Gleason). He grew up in the Lakeview neighborhood of Chicago on the southeast corner of Evanston (now Broadway) Ave. and Oakdale Ave. in a townhouse that his father later demolished, along with all of the others on the block, to redevelop as a four-story commercial building with apartments above. 

Bates began his film career in the 1910s with Essanay Studios of the Chicago film industry, and his World War I draft Registration Card listed him as a travelling actor for Francis Owen & Co.  He appeared on Broadway in the late 1920s and early 1930s, notably in the original production of Merrily We Roll Along (1934) by George S. Kaufman and Moss Hart. He was also the Conductor in the original production of Twentieth Century (1932).

From the 1930s, he appeared in a number of classic films, although sometimes uncredited.  He received favorable notice for his character roles, such as in My Favorite Wife (1940), where he played an irascible judge - The New York Times critic Bosley Crowther wrote "Mr. Bates deserves a separate mention for his masterpiece of comic creation." Another New York Times reviewer noted that "Edward Ellis and Granville Bates provoked an early audience yesterday to gentle laughter in a brief but quietly amusing sequence" in Chatterbox (1936), while Crowther praised his work in Men Against the Sky (1940): "The players' performances are stock and pedestrian, excepting that of Granville Bates as a cynical banker".

Bates died of a heart attack in Hollywood on July 9, 1940. He was buried at Graceland Cemetery in Chicago.

Selected plays in which Granville Bates appeared

Selected filmography

 Young Mother Hubbard (1917) - James
 The Kill-Joy (1917) - The Crab
 Jealousy (1929) - Lawyer
 The Sap from Syracuse (1930) - Nycross
 Honor Among Lovers (1931) - Clark
 The Smiling Lieutenant (1931) - Bill Collector (uncredited)
 The Wiser Sex (1932) - City Editor
 Midnight (1934) - Henry McGrath
 Woman in the Dark (1934) - Sheriff Grant
 Woman Wanted (1935) - Casey (scenes deleted)
 Pursuit (1935) - Auto Camp Proprietor
 O'Shaughnessy's Boy (1935) - Doctor
 I Live My Life (1935) - Yacht Captain (uncredited)
 Chatterbox (1936) - Philip Greene Sr
 Here Comes Trouble (1936)
 The Music Goes 'Round (1936) - Political Speaker (uncredited)
 13 Hours by Air (1936) - Pop Andrews
 Times Square Playboy (1936) - Mr. Mort Calhoun
 Hearts Divided (1936) - Robert Livingston (uncredited)
 Poppy (1936) - Mayor Farnsworth
 The Captain's Kid (1936) - Sheriff Pengast
 The Plainsman (1936) - Van Ellyn
 Sing Me a Love Song (1936) - Mr. Goodrich (uncredited)
 Beloved Enemy (1936) - Ryan
 Larceny on the Air (1937) - Prof. Rexford Sterling
 Breezing Home (1937) - Head Politician (uncredited)
 Green Light (1937) - Sheriff
 The Great O'Malley (1937) - Jake - Bar Proprietor (uncredited)
 When's Your Birthday? (1937) - Judge O'Day
 Nancy Steele Is Missing! (1937) - Joseph F.X. Flaherty
 Waikiki Wedding (1937) - Uncle Herman
 Let's Get Married (1937) - Hank Keith
 The Good Old Soak (1937) - Sam (uncredited)
 Mountain Justice (1937) - Judge Crawley at Jeff's Trial
 Make Way for Tomorrow (1937) - Mr. Hunter (uncredited)
 Wings over Honolulu (1937) - Grocery Clerk (uncredited)
 They Won't Forget (1937) - Detective Pindar
 It Happened in Hollywood (1937) - Sam Bennett
 Back in Circulation (1937) - Dr. Evans
 The Perfect Specimen (1937) - Hooker - Garage Owner
 Under Suspicion (1937) - K.Y. Mitchell
 Mannequin (1937) - Mr. Gebhart (uncredited)
 Wells Fargo (1937) - Bradford - Banker
 The Buccaneer (1938) - Gentleman Wanting to Surrender (uncredited)
 The Jury's Secret (1938) - Judge Pendegast
 Gold Is Where You Find It (1938) - Nixon (scenes deleted)
 The Adventures of Marco Polo (1938) - Venetian Business Man (uncredited)
 Go Chase Yourself (1938) - Halliday
 Romance on the Run (1938) - Phelps
 Cowboy from Brooklyn (1938) - Pop Hardy
 Mr. Chump (1938) - Abner Sprague
 The Affairs of Annabel (1938) - Mr. Fletcher
 Youth Takes a Fling (1938) - Mr. Judd
 Garden of the Moon (1938) - Angus McGillicuddy
 A Man to Remember (1938) - George Sykes
 Young Dr. Kildare (1938) - Harry Cook (uncredited)
 The Sisters (1938) - Taft Election Announcer (uncredited)
 Hard to Get (1938) - Judge Harkness
 The Shining Hour (1938) - Second Man on Plane (uncredited)
 Next Time I Marry (1938) - H.E. Crocker
 The Great Man Votes (1939) - The Mayor
 Blackwell's Island (1939) - Prison Warden Stuart 'Stu' Granger
 Twelve Crowded Hours (1939) - James McEwen
 Sweepstakes Winner (1939) - Pop Reynolds
 Naughty but Nice (1939) - Judge Kennith B. Walters, Superior Court
 At the Circus (1939) - (uncredited)
 Indianapolis Speedway (1939) - Mr. Greer
 Espionage Agent (1939) - Phineas T. O'Grady
 Fast and Furious (1939) - Chief Miller
 Pride of the Blue Grass (1939) - Col. Bob Griner
 Eternally Yours (1939) - Ship Captain (uncredited)
 Our Neighbors – The Carters (1939) - Joseph Laurence
 Charlie McCarthy, Detective (1939) - Judge Black (uncredited)
 Of Mice and Men (1939) - Carlson
 Thou Shalt Not Kill (1939) - Mr. Miller
 Internationally Yours (1939)
 Brother Rat and a Baby (1940) - First Doctor (uncredited)
 Granny Get Your Gun (1940) - Tom Redding
 Millionaire Playboy (1940) - Stafford
 My Favorite Wife (1940) - Judge Bryson
 Brother Orchid (1940) - Pattonsville Superintendent
 The Mortal Storm (1940) - Professor Berg
 Anne of Windy Poplars (1940) - Dr. Walton (uncredited)
 Private Affairs (1940) - Judge Samuel Elmer Hamilton
 Flowing Gold (1940) - Charles Hammond / Shylock
 Men Against the Sky (1940) - Mr. Burdett (final film role)

References

External links

 
 

1882 births
1940 deaths
American male film actors
Burials at Graceland Cemetery (Chicago)
Male actors from Chicago
20th-century American male actors
American male stage actors